The following is a list of notable films set in Glasgow, Scotland, or in which a significant scene takes place there.

 Ae Fond Kiss... (2004)
 American Cousins (2003)
 Beautiful Creatures (2000)
 Carla's Song (1996)
 Comfort and Joy (1984)
 Danny the Dog (2005) released in the US as Unleashed
 Dear Frankie (2004)
 Death Watch (1980)
 Doomsday (2008)
 God Help the Girl (2014)
 Heavenly Pursuits (1986)
 In Search Of La Che (2011)
 The Jacket (2005)
 Late Night Shopping (2001)
 The Legend of Barney Thomson (2015) 
 Madeleine (1950)
 The Maggie (1954)
 My Name is Joe (1998)
 Neds (2010)
 Nina's Heavenly Delights (2006)
 Not Another Happy Ending (2013)
 On a Clear Day (2005)
 One Life Stand (2000)
 Perfect Sense (2011)
 Postmortem (1998)
 Ratcatcher (1999)
 Red Road (2006)
 Sawney: Flesh of Man (2012) aka Lord of Darkness
 A Sense of Freedom (1981)
 Skagerrak (2003)
 Small Faces (1996)
 Strictly Sinatra (2001)
 Sweet Sixteen (2002)
 That Sinking Feeling (1979)
 Under the Skin (2013)
 Wilbur Wants to Kill Himself (2002)
 World War Z (2006)
 Yeh Hai Jalwa (2002)
 Young Adam (2003)
 Wild Rose  (2018)

Glasgow
Films
Films set in Glasgow
Films set in Glasgow
Films set in Glasgow
Films set in Glasgow
Films set in Glasgow
Glasgow
 
Films